Tour de Force is a 1955 mystery crime novel by the author Christianna Brand.  It was the sixth novel in a series featuring the fictional police detective Inspector Cockrill. It was the last full-length novel in which Cockrill appears, although he features in some short stories. His sister Henrietta also features in the 1957 novel The Three Cornered Halo which uses the same setting as this work.

Synopsis
Against his better judgement Cockrill travels for a holiday on a Mediterranean island republic off the coast of Italy. When a murder is committed he becomes the initial suspect for the local investigating officer, whose methods he find inept. He sets out to solve the crime himself.

References

Bibliography
 Bargainnier, Earl F. & Dove George N. Cops and Constables: American and British Fictional Policemen. Popular Press, 1986.
 Reilly, John M. Twentieth Century Crime & Mystery Writers. Springer, 2015.

1955 British novels
Novels by Christianna Brand
British mystery novels
British detective novels
Michael Joseph books